The 2007 Ukrainian Cup Final was a football match that took place at the Olympic NSC on 27 May 2007. The match was the 16th Ukrainian Cup Final and it was contested by Shakhtar Donetsk and Dynamo Kyiv. The Olympic stadium is the traditional arena for the Cup final.

Road to Kyiv 

All 16 Ukrainian Premier League clubs do not have to go through qualification to get into the competition, so Dynamo and Shakhtar both qualified for the competition automatically.

Previous encounters 
Prior to the 2007 Cup Final, Dynamo and Shakhtar had met three times in previous Ukrainian Cup finals. Dynamo had defeated Shakhtar two times, since losing their very first meeting. In both of those meetings Dynamo was victorious 2–1. Shakhtar's best performance against Dynamo was back in the 2002 final, when the Miners were able to down the legendary Dynamo team in extra time 3–2. It was the first meeting between the team managers in this competition.

Match details

Match statistics

See also
 2006–07 Ukrainian Cup
 2006–07 Ukrainian Premier League

References

Cup Final
Ukrainian Cup finals
Ukrainian Cup Final 2007
Ukrainian Cup Final 2007
Sports competitions in Kyiv